Being Caribou is a 2005 documentary film that chronicles the travels of husband and wife Karsten Heuer and Leanne Allison following the migration of the Porcupine caribou herd, in order to explore the Arctic Refuge drilling controversy. The journey lasted 5 months, starting from the community of Old Crow, Yukon on April 8, 2003 and ending September 8, 2003. The film is produced by the National Film Board of Canada.

Karsten Heuer documented this trek with Leanne Allison, which was also their honeymoon, in his book Being Caribou: Five Months on Foot with an Arctic Herd. The book was published in 2005.

Plot
Allison, an environmentalist, and Heuer, a wildlife biologist, follow a herd of 120,000 caribou on foot, across 1,500 kilometres (900 Miles) of Arctic tundra, in order to raise awareness of threats to the caribou's survival. At stake is the herd's delicate habitat, which is threatened by proposed petroleum and natural gas development in the herd's calving grounds in Alaska's Arctic National Wildlife Refuge.

Awards
Winner of approximately 20 awards and honours, including a Gemini Award and Most Popular Canadian Film at the Vancouver International Film Festival.

See also
Oil on Ice

References

External links
 
 Watch Being Caribou at NFB.ca
 Leanne Allison and Karsten Heuer's Web site

2005 films
Canadian documentary films
National Film Board of Canada documentaries
Documentary films about environmental issues
Documentary films about nature
Documentary films about the Arctic
2005 documentary films
Documentary films about petroleum
Canadian Screen Award-winning television shows
2000s English-language films
2000s Canadian films